Ant Wars is a 1982 board game published by Jason McAllister Games.

Gameplay
Ant Wars is a game in which tribes of ants battle each other for control of the back yard.

Reception
Steve Jackson reviewed Ant Wars in Space Gamer No. 66. Jackson commented that "On the whole [...] it's fun. I can't help it . . . I have to say this: I like it despite the bugs in it. Sorry . . . couldn't resist."

Reviews
White Wolf #43 (May 1994)

References

Biology-themed board games
Board games introduced in 1982